Hawkins Bar is an unincorporated community in Trinity County, California, United States.

Climate
This region experiences warm (but not hot) and dry summers, with no average monthly temperatures above 71.6 °F.  According to the Köppen Climate Classification system, Hawkins Bar has a warm-summer Mediterranean climate, abbreviated "Csb" on climate maps.

See also
Trinity County, California

References

Unincorporated communities in Trinity County, California
Unincorporated communities in California